Siler City High School, also known as the Paul Braxton School, is a historic high school building located at Siler City, Chatham County, North Carolina.  It was built in 1922, and is a two-story, "T"-shaped, five-bay school building with streamlined Art Deco design elements. It has a two-story-high auditorium wing.  Also on the property are the contributing mid-1930s one-story brick woodworking shop building which now serves as a community center, a 1 1/2-story frame gymnasium begun in 1930, and an early 1930s dirt baseball field which was initially a football field.

It was listed on the National Register of Historic Places in 1998.

References

School buildings on the National Register of Historic Places in North Carolina
Art Deco architecture in North Carolina
School buildings completed in 1922
Buildings and structures in Chatham County, North Carolina
National Register of Historic Places in Chatham County, North Carolina
1922 establishments in North Carolina